Anna Yuriivna Khnychenkova (born 12 November 1994) is a Ukrainian figure skater. As a single skater, she is the 2016 Ice Star champion, 2017 International Cup of Nice bronze medalist, and 2017 Ukrainian national champion. She has competed in the free skate at five ISU Championships and qualified a spot for Ukraine at the 2018 Winter Olympics.

Earlier in her career, Khnychenkova competed in pair skating for Ukraine and Hungary.

Pair skating

Partnership with Kulbach 
From 2008 to 2009, Khnychenkova competed in pair skating with Sergei Kulbach for Ukraine. Coached by Viacheslav Tkachenko in Dnipro, they finished 20th at the 2009 World Junior Championships.

Partnership with Magyar 
In 2009, Khnychenkova and Márk Magyar decided to compete together for Hungary. In the 2009–2010 season, the pair trained under Viacheslav Tkachenko in Budapest. They placed 15th at their first international event – the World Junior Championships, held in March 2010 in The Hague, Netherlands.

In the 2010–2011 season, Khnychenkova/Magyar trained in Toruń, Poland, and Budapest, Hungary, coached by Dorota Siudek and Mariusz Siudek. They placed 7th at a senior Grand Prix event, the Trophée Éric Bompard in November 2010. In March 2011, they finished 13th at the World Junior Championships in Gangneung, South Korea; it was their final competition as a pair.

Single skating

Early career 
Knychenkova began learning to skate in 1999. After a period abroad, she returned to Ukraine in 2011 and rejoined Viacheslav Tkachenko in Dnipro. In December 2011, she finished 5th competing in senior ladies' singles at the Ukrainian Championships. In October 2012, she won the junior silver medal at the Tirnavia Ice Cup, her first international competition as a single skater for Ukraine. Her senior international debut came in December at the 2012 NRW Trophy.

Khnychenkova placed 17th at the 2013 World Junior Championships in Milan. In 2014, she was assigned to her second World Junior Championships. She finished 17th at the event, held in Sofia, Bulgaria.

2015–2016 season 
Knychenkova placed 4th at the 2015 International Cup of Nice. She had a knee sprain and some boot issues in the first half of the season. Although second at the Ukrainian Championships, she was selected to compete at two senior ISU Championships because the champion, Anastasia Hozhva, was not yet age-eligible to compete internationally on the senior level. In January, Khnychenkova qualified to the final segment at the 2016 European Championships in Bratislava (Slovakia) by placing 19th in the short; she was 22nd in the free and finished 21st overall. In March, she reached the free skate at the 2016 World Championships in Boston and finished 19th overall.

2016–2017 season 
Khnychenkova won gold at Ice Star, held in Belarus in November 2016. In December, she won the Ukrainian national title by a margin of 17 points over Hozhva. At the 2017 European Championships in Ostrava (Czech Republic), she advanced to the free skate and finished 21st overall.

Ranked 35th in the short program, she did not reach the final segment at the 2017 World Championships in Helsinki, Finland.

2017–2018 season 
Khnychenkova began her season in early September, finishing 6th at the Slovenia Open. At the end of the month, she competed at the 2017 CS Nebelhorn Trophy, the final qualifying opportunity for the 2018 Winter Olympics. Ranked 4th in the short program and 8th in the free skate, she finished 7th overall and earned a spot for Ukraine at the Olympics. In October, she won the bronze medal at the International Cup of Nice.

Programs

Single skating

With Magyar

With Kulbach

Competitive highlights 
GP: Grand Prix; CS: Challenger Series; JGP: Junior Grand Prix

Single skating for Ukraine

Pair skating with Magyar for Hungary

Pair skating with Kulbach for Ukraine

References

External links 

 

1994 births
Living people
Sportspeople from Dnipro
Ukrainian female single skaters
Ukrainian female pair skaters
Hungarian female pair skaters
Ukrainian emigrants to Hungary
Figure skaters at the 2018 Winter Olympics
Olympic figure skaters of Ukraine
Competitors at the 2015 Winter Universiade
Competitors at the 2013 Winter Universiade